Vanillylmandelic acid (VMA) is a chemical intermediate in the synthesis of artificial vanilla flavorings and is an end-stage metabolite of the catecholamines (dopamine, epinephrine, and norepinephrine). It is produced via intermediary metabolites.

Chemical synthesis
VMA synthesis is the first step of a two-step process practiced by Rhodia since the 1970s to synthesize artificial vanilla. Specifically the reaction entails the condensation of guaiacol and glyoxylic acid in an ice cold, aqueous solution with sodium hydroxide.

Biological elimination
VMA is found in the urine, along with other catecholamine metabolites, including homovanillic acid (HVA), metanephrine, and normetanephrine.  In timed urine tests the quantity excreted (usually per 24 hours) is assessed along with creatinine clearance, and the quantity of cortisols, catecholamines, and metanephrines excreted is also measured.

Clinical significance 
Urinary VMA is elevated in patients with tumors that secrete catecholamines.

These urinalysis tests are used to diagnose an adrenal gland tumor called pheochromocytoma, a tumor of catecholamine-secreting chromaffin cells. These tests may also be used to diagnose neuroblastomas, and to monitor treatment of these conditions.

Norepinephrine is metabolised into normetanephrine and VMA.  Norepinephrine is one of the hormones produced by the adrenal glands, which are found on top of the kidneys. These hormones are released into the blood during times of physical or emotional stress, which are factors that may skew the results of the test.

References 

Neurochemistry
Alpha hydroxy acids
O-methylated natural phenols
Phenolic human metabolites
Acetic acids
Vanilloids